Isenfluh is a hamlet in Switzerland, north of the road from Wilderswil to Lauterbrunnen. It is first mentioned in 1319 as Ysenfluo and in 1401 people from the Lötschental started to settle in the small hamlet. The hamlet belonged to the monastery in Interlaken since the 14th century was administered by the bailiff of Interlaken from 1528 to 1798.

In 1973, Isenfluh, together with Wengen, Muerren, Gimmelwald, Stechelberg and Lauterbrunnen, became part of the municipality of Lauterbrunnen. 
The infrastructure of Isenfluh is installed, but a lot of the support comes from self-help groups. Since the village school was closed for financial reasons by the government of the Canton of Bern, the children of Isenfluh attend school in Lauterbrunnen.

The main road (and bus route), Churchischlief, to Isenfluh traverses a  spiral tunnel. This opened in 1992 and replaced a previous mountain road destroyed by a 1987 landslide.

Isenfluh is a base for hiking and sleigh-rides and ice-climbing. The Swiss Alpine Club (Schweizerischen Alpenclubs), SAC, is a few hours away.

References

Villages in Switzerland
Bernese Oberland
Former municipalities of the canton of Bern